Chirk Town Football Club were a football team based in Weston Rhyn, Shropshire. The team last played in the North East Wales Football League Premier Division in the 2021–22 season, which is at the fourth tier of the Welsh football league system.

History
The club were formed in 2019 and joined the North East Wales League, which they won at their first attempt, edging out Brymbo Victoria on points-per-game in a season curtailed by the COVID-19 pandemic.

The club joined the newly formed North East Wales Football League in 2020 as a Premier Division club.

The club withdrew from the league late in the 2021–22 season and folded.

Honours
North East Wales League - Champions: 2019–20
Graham Edwards Memorial Trophy - Winners: 2019

References

North East Wales Football League clubs
Association football clubs established in 2019
Association football clubs disestablished in 2022
2019 establishments in England
2022 disestablishments in England
Defunct football clubs in Shropshire
Clwyd East Football League clubs
Defunct football clubs in England